Sture Allén (31 December 1928 – 20 June 2022) was a Swedish professor of computational linguistics at the University of Gothenburg, who was the permanent secretary of the Swedish Academy between 1986 and 1999. Born in Gothenburg, he was elected to chair 3 of the Swedish Academy in 1980. He was also a member of the Norwegian Academy of Science and Letters and the Finnish Society of Sciences and Letters.

Bibliography
 Grafematisk analys som grundval för textedering : med särskild hänsyn till Johan Ekeblads brev till brodern Claes Ekeblad 1639–1655 (1965)
 Tiotusen i topp : ordfrekvenser i tidningstext (1972)
 Carl Ivar Ståhle : inträdestal i Svenska akademien (1980)
 Svenska Akademien och Svenska Språket : tre Studier (1986)
 Orden speglar samhället (1989); co-authors: Martin Gellerstam & Sven-Göran Malmgren
 Som ett lejon med kluven svans (1993)
 Modersmålet i fäderneslandet : ett urval uppsatser under fyrtio år (1999)
 Nobelpriset i litteratur : en introduktion (2001); co-author: Kjell Espmark
 Johan Ekeblad : vår man i 1600-talet (2006)
 Svensk ordlista (2008)
 Stadgar för Svenska Akademien (2012)
 Nobelpriset i litteratur : En introduktion (2014)

References 

 
 

1928 births
2022 deaths
People from Gothenburg
Members of the Swedish Academy
Linguists from Sweden
Academic staff of the University of Gothenburg
Members of the Norwegian Academy of Science and Letters
Computational linguistics researchers
Members of the Royal Society of Sciences and Letters in Gothenburg
Members of Academia Europaea
Members of the Finnish Academy of Science and Letters